Hauerseter Station is a railway station located at Hauerseter in Ullensaker, Norway on the Trunk Line. The station was opened in 1894 and is served by commuter train R13 from Drammen via Oslo Central Station to Dal. 

From 1947 until the construction of Gardermoen Line and Oslo Airport, Gardermoen in the 1990s, Hauerseter was the terminal station of the Hauerseter–Gardermoen Line, a branch line that went to Gardermoen Air Station.

External links

  Entry at Norwegian National Rail Administration 

Railway stations on the Trunk Line
Railway stations in Ullensaker
Railway stations opened in 1894
1894 establishments in Norway